Superkiller viralicidic activity 2-like 2 is a protein that in humans is encoded by the SKIV2L2 gene.

References

Further reading